Shahdara District is an administrative and revenue district of Delhi, India, situated near the banks of Yamuna river. The district headquarters is Nand Nagri. It is one of the oldest inhabited areas of Delhi and integral to what is known as Purani Dilli (Old Delhi). Shahdara district was formed in 2012 and has a collectorate office at Nand Nagri, Delhi.

Etymology 
In Urdu, Shahdara means "door of kings". The origin of the name lies in two Persian words: shah meaning "kings" and dara, a door or entrance. Shahdara was established by a Mughal king.

History 
The Shahdara district was formed in September 2012.

Shahdara ( walled) is also known as Chandrawali village through revenue records of SDM) dating to the 16th century CE. The rampart of Chandrawal so round with Pathanpura,  Teliwara, Arjun Bagichi Bahal Mohalla, premises on circular Road, Pal (Gadariya)gali, KUMHAR (POTTER) ETC

The T point of Chhota Bazaar & Teliwara is still called Loni Gate in the North of walled Shahdara & Delhi Gate at Bara Bazaar provides its history

There were even Khidki Darwaje 1) Maharam Gali end) 2) Jain Mandir Gali  ending steep East slopes

The oldest temples are the largest Vaishnav Temples both known as Bara Thakurdwara Chhota Thakurdwara which has larger premises area than any other temple in whole Delhi Besides both temples have supporting agricultural land in Chaura Raghunath pur (Noida) & near palwal

There were innumerable Tilas all around trans Yamuna  & were important watch towers

The oldest and the largest school out of west of Shahdara Delhi Gate was initially  DBAV middle school and served as the only school getting students from Chilla Gazipur, Gokulpur villages

Soon after post partition this school changed into four schools and one of them is paradoxically called Babu Ram Government School

The area around Shahdara has hard water and both Yamuna & Hindon flowed together threatening it several times till the first member of parliament CK Nayar constructed East Pushta with Shram Dan

It was used as a stopover in the passage from Meerut to Delhi. After Chandni Chowk, Shahdara is the among the oldest suburbs of Delhi. In the 18th century CE, Shahdara had grain warehouses and wholesale grain markets which supplied the Paharganj grain market, across the Yamuna river.

Administration 
Shahdara consists of 3 Subdivision- Shahdara, Vivek Vihar and Seemapuri.

Economic establishments and infrastructure 
Shahdara is the fourth station on Line 1 (Red Line) of the Delhi Metro from Dilshad Garden. The Cross River Mall contains liquor shops, cafes, restaurants, and a movie theatre. The Vikas Cine Mall contains an Indian Bank branch and a movie theatre. The Leela ambiance is the 5-star hotel in this area. The Plaza and various other hotels like Ginger, Park Plaza are also there. It has Barbeque Nation at Vivek Vihar near CBD. Various world-class education institutions and top universities of India are establishing their campus here.

Religious sites 
Shahdara is the location of a number of religious places. Shree Sai Sarnam Mandir near Shahdara metro station. Old church in Chhota Bazar area. Gurudwara near the refugee rehabilitation colony of Kabir Nagar (where many Sikh refugees from Pakistan live). Arya Samaj Mandir in Shivaji Park. Janardhan Mandir and Kirti Mandir in Subhash Park. Hanuman Mandir on Hanuman Road. Few other smaller temples also are there. There are also some mosques in Shahdara.

The Akshardham is a famous temple and a centre of the cultural and historical art exhibition and it is 10  km from Shahdara.

Localities 
Shahdara subdistrict is further divided into two parts of the Municipal Council zones of Delhi which are named as the ‘South Shahdara’ zone and the ‘North Shahdara’ zone. These zones are bounded by important areas like Dilshad Garden, Dilshad Colony and Tahirpur, Preet Vihar, Bhajanpura and Yamuna Vihar.

Ram Nagar 
This residential area was once farmland. Mandoli road hosts a market for daily goods and domestic items.In late 80s Ch. Dhan singh was the leader (Pradhan) of bhagwan pur khera, Shahdara and on the other hand he was a part of congress member committee  as well and served on that behalf.

New Modern Shahdara 
New Modern Shahdara has two parts: New Modern Shahdara (Budh Bazar) Mandoli Road and New Modern Shahdara II. There are the DDA road and the Shashi public sec. school and City convent school. The pin code of this area is 110032. It comes under the jurisdiction of Mansarovar Park police station and has the Shahdara post office. Area New Modern Shahdara II. It is situated in Chandrawali village dating to the 16th century CE. There are 14 streets.
Late Ch. Mahender Singh Bhati was a well-known personality of this colony and he was the First Pradhan of New Modern Shahdara.

Naveen Shahdara 
Naveen Shahdara is between Shahdara and Welcome metro stations and behind Shyam Lal College. It is an affluent area with parks, schools, colleges, and bakeries. It has a number of shopping sites. It is a posh area of Shahdara consisting of the Residents Welfare Association.

Teliwara 
Oldest area of Shahdara. It is main market of Shahdara. This area was pillar of social activities in past. "Goverdhan Bihari", Goverdhan Das and Bihari Lal Harit started social revolution since 1940. Bihari Lal Harit gave popular slogan "Jai Bhim" for Dalit Community. This area was center of political activities also.

Bholanath Nagar 
Bholanath Nagar is an older colony in Shahdara. There are government and private schools located in this area including Baburam school, Sanatan Dharm Devnagri Pathshala school, Handa school, Bloom public school, and Children Welfare public school. Jharkhandi temple, an old religious establishment, is also located here. Bhola Nath Bhatnagar, Zamindar of Shahdara is Founder of this Area.

Bihari Colony 
Bihari Colony is adjacent to Bholanath Nagar and Welcome Metro Station. Veer Abhimanyu park in Bihari Colony was one of the largest parks in Shahdara which has now been converted to municipal parking. Its full name is Goverdhan Bihari colony but now it's famous as Bihari colony. Two friends Goverdhan das and Bihari Lal Harit, both social reformers and writers are founders of this colony.

Vishwas Nagar 
Vishwas Nagar is a large suburb in Shahdara with approximately 50,000 registered voters. Unlike most of Shahdara, it is a well-settled and planned colony with parallel streets, some of which are named after the Pandavas. The two main roads are Pandav road and 60 feet road. On 60 feet road are a number of banks. Parallel to 60 feet road is Bhishma road and Kunti road, which provide a bypass for traffic. The 60 feet road is also the site of a weekly market on Saturday. It had one of the oldest industrial areas in Delhi consisting of more than 10,000 small scale factories. Vishwas Nagar also had a cinema called the Supreme theatre; previously the Swarn cinema which is no more operational. The "Vishwas Nagar Extension" and the "New Vishwas Nagar" are areas of greater affluence containing a central business district.

In Vishwas Nagar are the Mata Chintapurni Temple, Maharaja Surajmal Park, the Cross River Mall, the Unity One Mall (earlier known as Agarwal Fun City Mall), the Leela Ambience Hotel (earlier, Kempinski Ambience hotel), the Park Plaza hotel, a CNG pump station, two petrol pumps, a fire station, the central pollution control board, the Karkardooma court, the Institute of Chartered Accountants of India, a planned University of Delhi campus and an under construction I.P. University Campus. There are a number of schools including a government senior secondary school, and an MCD school,

Bhikam Singh Colony 
Bhikam Singh lies within Vishwas Nagar ward number 226. Sites in this area include 64 Gali, the new Sanjay Amar development in Kasturba Nagar,   the new Vishwas Nagar development, the Shivam enclave, Lahri development, and the Anupam apartment complex.

Shalimar Park 
Shalimar Park is an area of affluence. There is a Children's Welfare public school. The nearest metro station is East Azad Nagar (Pink Line) and interchange Welcome station.

Kardam Puri 
Kardam Puri is the suburb in Shahdara with the largest population. Jia Lal Kardam is founder of this colony.

Jyoti Nagar East, Jyoti Nagar West 
Jyoti Nagar is a leafy affluent area, once called Sikdarpur. It is situated 2.5  km from the Shahdara metro station with convenient connections and amenities. It occupies both sides of the Delhi-Saharanpur main highway, "Loni Road".

Central Park hosts the Jyoteshwar Mahadev temple to Lord Shiva; the Agrasen Dharamshala inn; the Chotta Shiva temple and the Durga temple. There is also a Bahirov temple in the area. Shivaratri, Navratri, Dashera and Janamashtami celebrations are held in the park. There is a government primary school, Sonia public school, Guru Harkishan public school, Takshila public school, Konark public school, Ekalavya library, HDFC bank and Lovely Flowers public school, Adarsh Institute(Durgapuri), Edlyf, Pizza diet, Vishal mega mart, Domino's pizza. Durgapuri square (chowk) is nearby. There is a market at Kardam marg.

Meet Nagar 
It is situated on main Wazirabad Road near the railway line. It has 4 Blocks Namely A, B, and C A Block in which middle and upper-middle-class people reside.
It has its own Railway Station.
There is Old play way School Jawahar Lal Nehru School" currently managed by Shakti Pandit Ji, Maternal uncle of Adv. Raja Pandit.

 Jyoti Colony 
Jyoti Colony is a very old area near Loni road and 100 Foot road. On the Durga Puri Chowk, there is an old large temple of Mata Durga on Loni road, and there is a Makki mosque.

 North Chajjupur (Indira Niketan) 
Chajjupur is one of the oldest colonies in Shahdara. It is about 2  km from Shahdara metro station and about 500m from Durgapuri chowk.  Chajjupur has a temple of Lord Shiva. Chanakya marg runs through ChajjPur, connecting Jyoti Colony and Babarpur.

 Chhota Bazaar / Bara Bazaar 
The Chhota Bazaar is one of the oldest and largest bazaars in Shahdara & Delhi. Civil Hospital is there in front of Mewa Ganj on the same road. It is a centre for ladies' clothes (sari, suits and kurta). One of the oldest markets is "Teliwara", which was a center for the mustard oil trade for many years till British rule. When we enter Teliwara there is a landmark in the middle of the market named "Jat Dharamshala". Geeta Bhawan is also famous for facilitating wedding occasions and parties. Still one can find many ancient houses with rare crafted designs here, especially in Pathan Pura Gali, Old Teliwara. Before the setup of Delhi Metro station, there used to be a famous fruit and grain market which used to attract all the locals from east Delhi. Half of this market is still active near Shahdara Bus Terminal near the gas agency. Near Anaj mandi there are Mohalla Gajju Katra, Mohalla Sarai, Maharam Mohalla(old name is Noon ki Mandi, Ghee ki Mandi).

Another market place is the Anaj Mandi, a grain market that becomes a place of worship to Hanuman each Tuesday and Saturday. The Hanuman mandir (temple) dates to the 1700s. The bazaar has close proximity to Shahdara railway station, Jwala Nagar, Jain Mandir Gali, and Shahdara metro station.

Currently, this area is progressing day by day as having a new posh flat system and new business hubs.

 Rohtash Nagar 
Rohtash Nagar is an old area divided into Rohtash Nagar East and Rohtash Nagar West. It has been spread unevenly and has mix population of Punjabis Baniyas Brahmins and other castes. Hira Lal sweets & LAVANYA - redefining fashion brand is a very famous shop. Hanuman road is a market area in Rohtash Nagar. Shahdara metro station is one km from Rohtash Nagar.

 Balbir Nagar & Balbir Nagar Extension 
Balbir Nagar is a clean posh residential area, home to businessmen and upper-middle-class people. There are many temples. There is a park named Prem Chopra Park. Balbir Nagar Extension has wider streets compared to Balbir Nagar.
It has the majority of Brahmin Population with a teaching background. In its initial days, Retd & working Govt. Teachers were its residents.
The area has Arwachin School, Goverdhan School, Vivekananda School, Anurag Bharti playschool, GBBSS.
The energy point is a food point for youngsters. Janta hotel is a budget Indian eatery.
This area has Jain Mandir, a 60-foot road. There are various intellectuals living in Balbir Nagar & Balbir Nagar Extension.

 Shivaji Park 
Shivaji Park is near Naveen Shahdara. Middle and upper-middle-class people reside there. There is the Little Flower Public School. Also, Shivaji Park is a hub of learning institutes.

 Gorakh Park 
Most of the residents of Gorakh Park are business people from the Upper-middle-class. It is being divided into East and West Gorakh park. Hanuman Mandir road market is very close to it. Bhagat sweets is there in this area

 Nathu Colony 

Nathu Colony lies on the Mandoli road which starts from GT Road and ends at Mandoli Chungi. Nathu Chowk is also popular as a landmark. East Nathu Colony is better than the west Nathu Colony in terms of wealth as well as the standard of living. Nathu chowk is also known by the Plus Sage library. There is an underpass from Nathu Chowk to go to GTB Hospital and towards Gagan Cinema and Dilshad Garden.

 Ashok Nagar 
Ashok Nagar is a large, affluent suburb in which middle and upper-middle-class people reside. It has a well-known daily market, the Shukr Bazar Chowk. Schools include Deep Public School, Siddharth International, Krishna Bodh School and Plus Sage library. Delhi Development Authority MIG and LIG flats are situated at Loni Road's west 30 mins away from Shahdara metro station by four-wheeler. There is also Mangal Pandey Road and Mandoli Road in the east. Delhi University Bhimrao Ambedkar college is just 20 mins away from this area.

 Chander Lok Colony 
This residential area was also once a small farmland called Sikdarpur village and is now a clean residential area. The inhabitants are of lower to the middle class. Ram Nagar, Nathu chowk and Mandoli road are nearby. Landmarks along Mandoli road include Hanuman mandir and Nathu Chowk. Shahdara railway & Metro station are nearby railway stations.

 Kabool Nagar 
The Kabool Nagar has a huge and well maintained Shirdi Sai Baba Temple and is popular among Shirdi Sai baba Devotees. People throng from far away places to visit this temple. Part of Kabool Nagar has two-story dwellings. Its residents are affluent and educated. It is a safe area with well maintained civic parks. Nearby is the Rohtash Nagar market and the Shukr Bazar. Most residents are Jains or Punjabi.

 Babarpur 
Babarpur has its origins in an old village. It is an affluent area with amenities. The main street has an automobile, schools and furniture showrooms. The Hariom Gali of Babarpur, a welfare association founded in 1982, hosts a dharamshal, a religious sanctuary.

 Mansarovar Park 
This area has wide roads, a metro station, water drainage, and DDA flats. This area has all the required facilities like Private and Government Schools, police office, Dispensary, Post office, Bus Stand, Temples, Mother dairy, Parks and the most important is its own Metro Station. The area also has a Jain charitable hospital where they charge a very nominal fee. This area is also known to have the base location of social organizations like the Indian Arts Foundation and Mansarovar Park Welfare Organization.

 Durga Puri 
Durga Puri is a well-organized area, previously known as Sikdarpur''. Durga Puri is located near to a temple on Durga Puri Chowk, 2  km from Shahdara railway station.

Jagjivan Nagar 
Jagjivan Nagar is located on Loni Road near Durga Puri Chowk. Bihari Lal Harit, a famous reformer developed this area in the name of Babu Jagjivan Ram, Former Deputy Prime Minister of India.

Shri Ram Nagar 
This area is situated near the Grand Trunk Road. It was established in 1927. Here middle and upper-middle-class people reside. There is a mixed society of Jains, Hindus, Sikhs, and Muslims.

Ganga Vihar 
Ganga Vihar Pin code is 110094 and postal head office is Sonia Vihar. It is near to the Gokulpuri Metro.

Jwala Nagar 

Jwala Nagar is a locality in North East Delhi City in the North East Delhi District of Shahdara. Jwala Nagar, Shahdara pin code is 110032 and postal head office is Shahdara. Hindi is the local language here. The area is quite congested with narrow roads close to Shahdara Metro Station and Shri Ram Mini Stadium is previously known as Ramlila Ground(Maidan) as a Landmark. It also has renowned St. John's Academy school along with a couple of Government schools. Its greenery is also well maintained with nearby parks like Indira Park, Ambedkar Park, and Kasturba Gandhi Park. Jwala Devi, wife of Bhola Nath Bhatnagar, Zamindar of Shahdara, is founder of this area.

See also

References

External links 
 Official website

 
Bazaars in India
Cities and towns in North East Delhi district
 Districts of Delhi
District subdivisions of Delhi
East Delhi district
Neighbourhoods in Delhi
Retail markets in Delhi
Retail markets in India